The Holy Trinity Church is a medieval Byzantine church which stands on a hill in the city of Berat in the Kalaja district  of Southern Albania. 

One of the Historic Centres of Berat and Gjirokastër UNESCO World Heritage Site, the church has a cross shaped plan with a dome. It is composed of the nave, narthex (entrance area) and the altar alcove. In the church  many Byzantine architecture features have been skilfully used such as the inner organization of the space and the decorative and illuminative systems. These features, together with the pyramidal shape, forms and proportions give the church a picturesque appearance. The Byzantine architectural elements in the church have been combined with western architectural elements belonging to the same period. 

Inside the church are two columns with reused capitals (thought to have been taken from classical ruins in the city). An inscription inside the church contains the name of Andronicus Paleologus (Governor of the province of Berat from 1302 to 1326), indicating that the church must have been built during the 13th or 14th century with his financial support.

See also 

 Tourist attractions in Berat
 Culture of Albania
 Architecture of Albania
 Byzantine churches in Albania

References 

Berat
Berat
Berat
Churches in Berat
Berat
Berat
Berat